A list of films produced in Hong Kong in 1958:.

1958

References

External links
IMDB list of Hong Kong films
Hong Kong films of 1958 at HKcinemamagic.com

1958
Lists of 1958 films by country or language
1958 in Hong Kong